is a private university in Fushimi-ku, Kyoto, Kyoto, Japan, established in 1949.

External links
 Official website 

Educational institutions established in 1949
Private universities and colleges in Japan
Buddhist universities and colleges in Japan
Universities and colleges in Kyoto Prefecture
1949 establishments in Japan